This is a list of wars involving France and its predecessor states. It is an incomplete list of French and proto-French wars and battles from the foundation of Francia by Clovis I, the Merovingian king who united all the Frankish tribes and northern Gallo-Romans in the 5th century, to the current Fifth Republic.

Francia and West Francia

Kingdom of France (987–1792)

First French Republic (1792–1804)

First French Empire (1804–1814, 1815)

Bourbon Restoration (1814–15, 1815–1830)

July Monarchy (1830–1848)

Second French Republic (1848–1852)

Second French Empire (1852–1870)

French Third Republic (1870–1940)

Vichy France (1940–1944)

French Fourth Republic (1946–1958)

French Fifth Republic (1958–present)

Wars France was not involved in but provided support (material, political, advisory etc.)

Civil wars and revolutions

See also
 Anglo-French Wars
 Franco-Spanish War (disambiguation)
 ISIL-related terror attacks in France
 List of battles involving France
 List of wars in the Low Countries until 1560
 List of wars in the southern Low Countries (1560–1829)
 Military history of France

Notes

References

Citations

Bibliography

 
 
 
 
 

 

 
France
Wars and battles

French wars and battles
Wars